J. Quin Monson (born 1969) is an American political scientist and associate professor of political science at Brigham Young University. He is also a senior scholar at the university's Center for the Study of Elections and Democracy.

Monson holds a Ph.D. from Ohio State University.

One of Monson's leading articles is "The Religion Card: Gay Marriage and the 2004 Presidential Election" published with David E. Campbell in the Public Opinion Quarterly.

Monson is a co-author of Seeking the Promised Land: Mormons and American Politics with David E. Campbell and John C. Green.

Sources
Center for the Study of Elections and Democracy page on faculty
Cambridge University Press on Monson's book
NPR article quoting Monson on scouting
Washington Post article quoting Monson
Deseret News review of book by Monson

References

1969 births
Living people
Brigham Young University faculty
Ohio State University alumni
American political scientists